The 1987–88 Wessex Football League was the second season of the Wessex Football League. The league champions for the second consecutive season were Bashley. There was no promotion or relegation.

League table
The league consisted of one division of 19 clubs, increased from 17 the previous season despite the departures of Road-Sea Southampton and Portals Athletic. Four new clubs joined:
Christchurch 
East Cowes Victoria Athletic
Folland Sports, all three promoted from the Hampshire League Division One.
Wimborne Town, transferred from the Western League.

References

Wessex Football League seasons
9